Arthur William Hodge (1763–1811) was a plantation farmer, member of the Executive Council and Legislative Assembly, and slave owner in the British Virgin Islands, who was hanged on 8 May 1811, for the murder of one of his slaves.

He was the first West Indian slave owner to be executed for the murder of a slave considered his property, and perhaps the only British West Indian slave owner, or British subject, to be executed for murdering his slave. He was not however the first white person to have been lawfully executed for the killing of a slave, as some historians have claimed.

Early life
Arthur William Hodge was born in the British Virgin Islands, the son of Arthur Hodge of Tortola. He studied at Oriel College, Oxford, matriculating in December 1781. He briefly served in the British Army and was commissioned as a second lieutenant in the 23rd Regiment of Foot on 3 December 1782.

One of his three wives, Ann Hoggins (1779–1808), was a sister-in-law of the Marquess of Exeter. He was described as a man of great accomplishments and elegant manners. After his father's death, he returned in 1803 to the British Virgin Islands to assume control of the family's plantation Belle Vue in Tortola.

In 1811, Hodge was indicted for the murder of a single male slave, part of his estate, named Prosper. Restrictions on similar fact evidence were relatively casual in colonial courts, and much of the evidence seems to have focused upon acts of cruelty by Hodge towards slaves other than Prosper.

Trial reports suggest that Hodge was a sadistic and disturbed man. During the trial, evidence was presented that Hodge caused the deaths of other slaves in his estate, including: Tom Boiler, Cuffy, Else, Jupiter, Margaret, and Simon Boiler. Three male slaves: Jupiter, Tom Boiler and his brother Simon Boiler, were whipped to death. Cook Margaret and washerwoman Else died after boiling water was poured down their throats. Also slaves named Welcome, Gift and Violet were flogged to death.

Evidence was presented that Hodge was cruel to child slaves, including his own offspring: Bella, a small mulatto girl of about 8 years of age, who was his offspring by his slave, Peggy, was flogged and beaten and kicked by him personally; and that he had the heads of several mulatto children, possibly also sired by him, held under water until they lost consciousness, then had them revived, and had the process repeated. Sampson, a boy of 10 years of age, was dipped in boiling liquor, until all his skin peeled off.

Hodge previously had over 100 healthy slaves on his plantation, but when his wife Ann died in 1808, there were no longer enough slaves to dig a grave for her according to witness Daniel Ross. One witness testified that, in three years at least sixty Negroes had been buried, and only one had died a natural death.

The crime

Hodge had a reputation on Tortola for cruelty towards slaves.

The main evidence given at the trial relating to the death of Prosper was given by Perreen Georges, a free woman of colour.  She testified that:

The assaults took place on 2 October 1807 and the following day. Thirteen days later, on 15 October 1807, Prosper died of his wounds.  Hodge was not indicted for three years, until 11 March 1811. He then fled from his estates and was arrested by warrant.

The trial
The evidence against Hodge was strong and credible, and Hodge's defence was weak. The two strongest prosecution witnesses were Stephen McKeough, a white man who inspected the Hodge estate, and Perreen Georges.  Hodge tried to discredit them by alleging that McKeough was a drunk, and Georges was a thief. Hodge did not try to impeach the reputation of the third prosecution witness, Daniel Ross, a Justice of the Peace.

Hodge called his sister, Penelope, and a witness described as an "old black woman" to give testimony to his innocence, but reports suggest that their evidence was not regarded as credible.

As is customary in common law legal systems, the defendant was allowed to address the jury before they retired to consider their verdict, and Hodge said this:

However, the jury were also charged with the words of Richard Hetherington, President of the Council of the Territory:

On 30 April 1811, the jury retired to consider their verdict at about half past six in the morning.  By eight o'clock, they returned with a guilty verdict.  A majority of the jurors recommended mercy for Hodge.  Such recommendations were not binding, and the presiding judge, Chief Justice Robertson, pronounced that Hodge should be "hanged by the neck on Wednesday the 8 May following, until he was dead, on a spot near unto the common prison."

The execution

The Governor of the Leeward Islands Hugh Elliot was compelled to commission a militia to prevent reprisals "in a conjuncture so replete with party animosity".  He also imposed martial law every night from sunset to sunrise between the time of sentencing and the date of Hodge's execution.  Finally, he ordered HMS Cygnet to stand by to support the civilian authorities if it was needed.  Elliot may have been motivated by a concern for self-preservation, as he had been the primary proponent of the indictment of Hodge. White slave owners might be angry that a fellow white slave owner could be sentenced to death for the murder of his property, a black slave.

Hodge was allowed to "make his peace with God" in the following week. He was attended by two ministers of the Methodist church at St Christophers.  On the appointed day, he addressed certain individuals whom he singled out in the crowd, and asked them to forgive him for injuries which they had received at his hands.  He then addressed the crowd generally and asked them to forgive him.  Then he was hanged.

His body was then taken to his estate and he was buried not far from the grave of Prosper.

The law
At the time of Hodge's trial, slavery was still legal, but the trade in African slaves had been abolished by the Slave Trade Act 1807. Enslaved Africans were not formally freed until the Slavery Abolition Act 1833.

While some slave owners prescribed rules of conduct for the disciplining of slaves to remove fear of arbitrary or excessive punishments, these rules were not binding in law. During his unsuccessful bail application, Hodge's counsel argued that "A Negro being property, it was no greater offence for his master to kill him than it would be to kill his dog," but the court did not accept the submission.  Indeed, the point was dismissed without any serious discussion.

The boundaries of the legality of slavery were little explored under the common law, and it does not seem implausible that slavery could be permitted under the common law on the one hand, but for it to constitute a crime to kill a slave on the other.  In 1792 the captain of a slave ship, John Kimber, had stood trial in England for murdering a slave but was acquitted; it was not suggested at Kimber's trial that it was lawful to kill a slave. Many cases dealing with the status of slaves are well documented and well considered (see generally, slavery at common law).  Hodge did not have an opportunity to appeal his conviction in the eight days before execution.

Other jurisdictions
The case is also sometimes compared with North Carolina v. Mann, 13 N.C. 167 (N.C. 1830), in which the Supreme Court of North Carolina ruled that slave-holders could not be convicted for harming their slaves.

Motivations for prosecution
Hodge may have been sentenced to hang for political reasons:

 Several slave uprisings occurred in the British Virgin Islands before the trial, including a major one in May 1790 at the Pickering plantation.  Hanging a notoriously cruel slave owner might have been intended to help maintain control of the remaining slave population, who had grown restless as a result of the passing of the Slave Trade Act.  If this was the intent, it was not effective, as major rebellions broke out in 1823 and in 1830, and a planned uprising was uncovered in 1831.
 The Governor of the British Leeward Islands, Hugh Elliot, was an abolitionist. Elliot personally supervised the proceedings against Hodge, but since the trial was conducted before an independent judge with a sitting jury, it is unlikely he could have influenced its outcome.  He was aware that the economy of the British Virgin Islands might collapse without slave labour.  Nearly three years elapsed from the murder without anyone choosing to indict Hodge until Elliot was appointed governor.
 The third reason is that the British Virgin Islands were considered to be beset by lawlessness at the time.  Elliot was reported to have been struck by the "state of irritation ... almost of anarchy" in the British Virgin Islands.  Arresting a significant local figure like Hodge, putting him on trial, and executing him was a decisive demonstration of authority in an attempt to restore better legal order.

And finally, personal feuds may have played a role in indicting Hodge.  William Cox Robertson was a young man who had returned to Tortola and become engaged in a three way exchange of insults between himself, Hodge and George Martin (Robertson's father may have been killed by Hodge in a duel).) During the series of arguments, Martin went to Hodge's house on 3 January 1811 "and there most wantonly insulted and assaulted him" according to court records, before doing the same thing to Robertson later that day.  Hodge then made "half-uttered threats of calling [him] out", i.e. challenging him to a duel.  Martin decided that "it better not to fight him, without first attempting to deliver himself from such a desperate enemy, by bringing him to public justice" since Hodge was known to be an excellent pistol shot and duellist.

Ramifications

The ramifications of the execution of Hodge are difficult to gauge.  Some historians suggest that the "case stirred up feverish feelings in the islands, and even echoed to the outside world ... it was revolutionary for the times: this was an unprecedented trial, where a white man was proven guilty for the murder of a black man and sentenced to death." While the trial and execution may have shocked the slave-owning communities in the British West Indies, it does not appear to have had any immediate effect other than that on Hodge's plantation. There may have been other slave owners in the British West Indies who were as cruel as Hodge, but there does not seem to have been a move to put them on trial. And white slave owners do not appear to have voluntarily moderated their treatment of their black slaves after the trial. There appear to be no other records of any slave owners in the British West Indies being tried for the murder of their slaves.

Within the British Virgin Islands themselves, outside Hodge's estate, slaves were treated relatively well, which is not surprising in light of the growing value of slaves since the abolition of the African slave trade. While slaves would not be free until over twenty years had passed, enslaved people in the British Virgin Islands enjoyed greater protection from cruelty and injury by white slave owners.

Trying Hodge affected the British Virgin Island's finances. The British Virgin Islands spent nearly six hundred pounds sterling, and cost Hodge's estate nearly nine hundred pounds sterling, both extravagant sums for the time.

Descendants

After delivering the verdict in his trial, all of the jurors swore that to their knowledge Arthur Hodge held no property in the British Virgin Islands. This was patently not true, but allowed the court to avoid condemning his property, and allowed his estate to pass to his 7-year-old son, Henry Cecil Hodge. Arthur Hodge had adopted a new will leaving his estate to his son during the disputes with Musgrave and Martin which led to his execution, although there is no suggestion that he feared for his life at this time.

Years later the Hodge estate burned down, and son Henry Cecil Hodge remarked that he would be paying the price for his father's sins forever. Arthur Hodge had also two daughters Jane (b. 1801) and Ruth (b. 1806) with Ann Hoggins. With Jane MacNamara he had a daughter Rosina Jane (b. 1795). With slave Peggy he had a girl named Bella (c. 1798).

No white descendants of Hodge live in the British Virgin Islands today, although many of the descendants of his former slaves still do so. There are Hodges of mixed race descended from white Hodges.

See also
 Samuel Hodge VC  (c. 1840 – 1868) 
 List of slave owners
 List of white defendants executed for killing a black victim

Notes

References
Vernon Pickering, A concise history of the British Virgin Islands, 
Isaac Dookhan, A History of the British Virgin Islands, 
John Andrew, The Hanging of Arthur Hodge, 
A report into the trial of Arthur Hodge, Esq
Thumbnail of a portrait of Arthur Hodge

1763 births
1811 deaths
Alumni of Oriel College, Oxford
British slave owners
British Virgin Islands law
British Virgin Islands people convicted of murder
Executed British serial killers
Executed British Virgin Islands people
History of the British Virgin Islands
Male serial killers
People executed by British colonies by hanging
People executed by the British Leeward Islands
People executed for murder
People from Tortola
Royal Welch Fusiliers officers